Oak Hill High School may refer to:

 Oak Hill High School (Indiana), Converse, Indiana
 Oak Hill High School (Louisiana), Hineston, Louisiana
 Oak Hill High School (Maine), Wales, Maine
 Oak Hill High School (Ohio), Oak Hill, Ohio
 Oak Hill High School (West Virginia), Oak Hill, West Virginia

See also
 Oak Hills High School, Cincinnati, Ohio
 Oak Hill School, Eugene, Oregon